Peter Lawrie (born 22 March 1974) is an Irish professional golfer.

Early life
Lawrie was born in Dublin and educated at Terenure College and University College Dublin, where he took up a golf scholarship. He won the 1996 Irish Amateur Close Championship and turned professional in 1997.

Professional career
It took him several years to get a card on the European Tour. He finished fourth on the Challenge Tour Rankings in 2002, including a victory in the Challenge Tour Grand Final. This earned him a European Tour card for the first time. Lawrie credited much of this success to the help of swing coach, Brendan McDaid.

Lawrie had a solid debut season on the European Tour 2003 season and also became the first Irishman to be named the Sir Henry Cotton Rookie of the Year. He also lost in a playoff at the 2003 Canarias Open de España, when Kenneth Ferrie birdied the second extra hole to defeat Lawrie and Peter Hedblom.

He had consistently finished in the top 100 of the Order of Merit since then, with a best position of 36th in 2010.

Lawrie achieved a breakthrough victory in 2008 when he won his first title on the European Tour at the Open de España, where he defeated Ignacio Garrido in a playoff.

In September 2016, he announced his retirement from the European Tour at the end of the season to take up a position as a golf professional in Luttrellstown Castle Golf Club.

Professional wins (2)

European Tour wins (1)

European Tour playoff record (1–3)

Challenge Tour wins (1)

Results in major championships

Note: Lawrie never played in the Masters Tournament or the PGA Championship.

CUT = missed the half-way cut

Team appearances
Amateur
European Youths' Team Championship (representing Ireland): 1994 (winners)
European Amateur Team Championship (representing Ireland): 1997
Palmer Cup (representing Great Britain & Ireland): 1997

References

External links

Irish male golfers
European Tour golfers
Alumni of University College Dublin
Sportspeople from Dublin (city)
1974 births
Living people